Badiashile is a surname. Notable people with the surname include:

Benoît Badiashile, (born 2001), French footballer
Loïc Badiashile (born 1998), French footballer